The 2018 Penrith Panthers season was the 52nd in the club's history. Coached by Anthony Griffin (from round 1 to round 21) and Cameron Ciraldo (from round 22 onwards) on caretaker basis and captained by Peter Wallace and James Maloney, the Panthers competed in the National Rugby League's 2018 Telstra Premiership.

Squad

Player transfers
A † denotes that the transfer occurred during the 2018 season.

Fixtures

Pre-season

Regular season

Finals

Ladder

Statistics

Other teams
In addition to competing in the National Rugby League, the Panthers are also fielding semi-professional teams in the 2018 Jersey Flegg Cup (for players aged under 20) and the New South Wales Rugby League's 2018 Intrust Super Premiership (NSW Cup). The JF team is coached by Ben Harden, and the NSW Cup team is coached by Guy Missio.

Representative honours

Domestic

International

References 

Penrith Panthers seasons
Penrith Panthers season